Ufeus is a genus of moths of the family Noctuidae.

Species
 Ufeus carnea  Hampson, 1912
 Ufeus faunus Strecker, 1898
 Ufeus felsensteini Lafontaine & Walsh, 2013
 Ufeus hulstii Smith, 1908
 Ufeus plicatus Grote, 1873 (syn: Ufeus unicolor Grote, 1878)
 Ufeus satyricus Grote, 1873 (syn: Ufeus barometricus (Goossens, 1881))

References

 Grote (1873). Bull. Buffalo Soc. Nat. Sci. 1: 101-102
 
 Ufeus at funet

Noctuidae